Ozoroa namaquensis (Gariep resin tree) is a species of plant in the family Anacardiaceae. It is found in Namibia and South Africa. It is threatened by habitat loss, and a protected tree in South Africa.

References

namaquensis
Data deficient plants
Protected trees of South Africa
Flora of Namibia
Taxonomy articles created by Polbot